Perihan Topaloğlu Acar (born Topaloğlu on August 31, 1987) is a Turkish women's handballer, who plays in the Turkish Women's Handball Super League for Ardeşen GSK, and the Turkey national team. She is the captain of both teams. The -tall sportswoman plays in the left back position.

Private life
Perihan Topaloğlu was born to Gürsel Topaloğlu in Bartın, Turkey on August 31, 1987. Her father died at a traffic accident in January 2014.

She studied at Kastamonu University, and played for the university team during this time.

In September 2015, she married Doğan Acar, a footballer of the Ardeşenspor.

Career

Club
Kastamonu Gençlik Merkezi SK – Kastamonu Türk Telekom
At age 16, she began to play handball joining Kastamonu Gençlik Merkezi SK in the pivot position. She took part with her team at the 2003–04 Women's EHF Cup.

In the 2009–10 season, her club was renamed to Kastamonu Türk telekom. She played at the 2009/10 Women's EHF Challenge Cup.

Muratpaşa Bld. SK
In the 2010–11 season, Topaloğlu moved to Muratpaşa Bld. SK in Antalya. She played in the Women's EHF Challenge Cup (2010–11, 2011–12), Women's EHF Cup Winners' Cup (2012–13) and Women's EHF Champions League (2013–14).

 Ardeşen GSK
Toplaoğlu was transferred by the Rize-based Ardeşen GSK in July 2013. She serves as team captain. She played in the Women's EHF Challenge Cup (2013–14, 2014–15) and Women's EHF Cup Winners' Cup (2015–16).

International

In 2005, Topaloğlu was admitted to the Turkey women's national handball team. She is a permanent member of the national team.

She played at the 2013 Mediterranean Games, and 2015 World Women's Handball Championship – European qualification matches.

Honours

Individual
 Best Scorer, 6th European Universities Handball Championships (2011), Rijeka, Croatia.
 Topscorer, 7th European Universities Handball Championships (2012), Cordoba, Spain.
 Topscorer, 2013–14 Turkish Women's Handball Super League.

References 

1987 births
People from Bartın
Turkish female handball players
Muratpaşa Bld. SK (women's handball) players
Ardeşen GSK players
Turkey women's national handball players
Living people
Kastamonu University alumni